WKDS (89.9 FM) is a radio station licensed to Kalamazoo, Michigan. The station is known as "Classical WMUK" and operated by Western Michigan University as a companion to its WMUK (102.1 FM).

History
The station was run by high school students in the Kalamazoo Public Schools school district until a time brokerage agreement was signed with Western Michigan University on November 18, 2019. The frequency was used by WMU to separate its public WMUK (102.1 FM) into news/talk and classical music stations. In April, the Kalamazoo board of education, stating the station no longer was needed for educational purposes, approved its outright sale to WMU under a $125,000 agreement that also included a 24-month lease of the WKDS studios at Loy Norrix High School, while the district would receive underwriting time on WMUK and $20,000 to convert the school operation to an internet radio station.

References

Michiguide.com - WKDS History

External links

KDS
Western Michigan University
Radio stations established in 1983
Classical music radio stations in the United States
NPR member stations